The 1924–25 season was the 27th in the history of the Southern League. As in the previous season, the league was split into Eastern and Western Divisions. Southampton II won the Eastern Division and Swansea Town II won the Western Division. Southampton were declared Southern League champions after defeating Swansea 2–1 in a championship play-off.

Mid Rhondda United, who finished fifth in the Western Division, were the only club to apply to join the Football League, but were unsuccessful in the vote. Seven clubs left the league at the end of the season.

Eastern Division

A total of 16 teams contest the division, including 15 sides from previous season and one new team.

Newly elected teams:
 Nuneaton Town

Western Division

A total of 20 teams contest the division, including 18 sides from previous season and two new teams.

Newly elected teams:
 Mid Rhondda United
 Taunton United

Football League election
Mid-Rhondda United were the only non-League club to enter the elections for a place in the Football League Third Division South. However, they received no votes and both League clubs were re-elected.

References

1924-25
1924–25 in English football leagues
1924–25 in Welsh football